Miss Universe 1981, the 30th anniversary of the Miss Universe pageant, was held on 20 July 1981 at the Minskoff Theatre in New York City, United States. Irene Sáez of Venezuela was crowned by Shawn Weatherly of the United States. There were 77 contestants competing for the crown, but Miss Mauritius got homesick and withdrew. The pageant originally was scheduled to be held in Guatemala City, Guatemala. However, for financial and political reasons, Miss Universe was moved to New York City.

Results

Placements

Final Competition

Awards

Judges

 Sammy Cahn
 Chang Kang Jae
 Pelé
 Julio Iglesias
 Itzik Kol
 Lee Majors
 Mary McFadden
 David Merrick
 Anna Moffo
 LeRoy Neiman
 Lorin Netherlandser
 Francesco Scavullo
 Corinna Tsopei - Miss Universe 1964 from Greece

Contestants

  – Susana Mabel Reynoso
  – Synia Reyes
  – Karen Sang 
  – Gudrun Gollop
  – Linda Teresa Smith
  – Dominique van Eeckhoudt
  – Ivette Zabaneh
  – Cymone Florie Tucker
  – Vivian Zambrano
  – Adriana Alves de Oliveira
  – Carmen Nibbs
  – Dominique Dufour
  – Donna Marie Myrie
  – María Soledad Hurtado Arellano
  – Ana Edilma Cano Puerta
  – Rosa Inés Solís Vargas
  – Maria Maxima Croes
  – Katia Angelidou
  – Tina Brandstrup
  – Fausta Lucía Peña Veras
  – Lucía Isabel Vinueza Urjelles
  – Joanna Longley
  – Lynn Michelle McDonald
  – Merja Orvokki Varvikko
  – Isabelle Sophie Benard
  – Marion Kurz
  – Yvette Dominguez
  – Maria Nikouli
  – Rosette Bivuoac
  – Bertha Antoinette Harmon
  – Yuma Rossana Lobos Orellana
  – Ingrid Johanna Marie Schouten
  – Leslie Nohemí Sabillón Dávila
  – Irene Lo Kam-Sheung
  – Elisabet Traustadóttir
  – Rachita Kumar
  – Valerie Roe
  – Dana Wexler
  – Anna Maria Kanakis
  – Mineko Orisaku
  – Lee Eun-jung
  – Audrey Loh Yin Fong
  – Susanne Galea
  – Ghislaine Jean-Louis
  – Judith Grace González Hincks
  – Antoinette Anuza
  – Donella Thomsen
  – Juanita Masga Mendiola
  – Mona Olsen
  – Ana María Henríquez Valdés
  – María Isabel Urízar Caras
  – Gladys Silva Cancino
  – Maria Caroline de Vera Mendoza
  – Ana Paula Machado Moura
  – Carmen Lotti Rodríguez
  – Patricia Abadie
  – Anne McFarlane
  – Florence Tan
  – Daniela di Paolo
  – Frances Ondiviela
  – Renuka Varuni Jesudhason
  – Marva Warner
  – Eva-Lena Lundgren
  – Bridget Voss
  Tahiti – Tatiana Teraiamano
   – Massupha Karbprapun
  – Kedibone Tembisa Letlaka
  – Romini Samaroo
  – Şenay Unlu
  – Frances Gloria Rigby
  – Griselda Dianne Anchorena
  – Kim Seelbrede
  – Marise Cecile James
  – Irene Sáez Conde
  – Karen Ruth Stannard
  – Lenita Marianne Schwalger

Notes

Debuts

Returns

Last competed in 1957:
 

Last competed in 1974:
 

Last competed in 1979:

Replacements
  - Doris Loh was replaced by Irene Lo Kam-Sheung.

Withdrawals

  - Rossje Soeratman
  - Carole Fitzgerald was homesick and then withdrew.
  - Jennifer Abaijah was completed at Miss World 1981 instead.

Did not compete
  – Marsha Ann Morris
  – Joan Boldewijn went to Miss World instead.

General references

References

External links
 Miss Universe official website
 Miss Universe 1981 Delegates
 Miss Universe 1981 Summary

1981 beauty pageants
1981 in New York City
1980s in Manhattan
Beauty pageants in the United States
Competitions in New York City
July 1981 events in the United States
1981